Racism in China arises from Chinese history, nationalism, sinicization, and other factors. Racism in modern China has been documented in numerous situations. Ethnic tensions have led to numerous incidents in the country such as the Xinjiang conflict, the ongoing internment and state persecution of Uyghurs and other ethnic minorities, the 2010 Tibetan language protest (a protest against the sinicization of Tibet), the 2020 Inner Mongolia protests and discrimination against Africans and people of African descent.

Demographic background
China is a largely homogeneous society; over 90% of its population has historically been Han Chinese. Some of the country's ethnic groups are distinguishable by physical appearance and relatively-low intermarriage rates. Others have married Han Chinese and resemble them. A growing number of ethnic minorities are fluent at a native level in Mandarin Chinese. Children sometimes receive ethnic-minority status at birth if one of their parents belongs to an ethnic minority, even if their ancestry is predominantly Han Chinese. Pockets of immigrants and foreign residents exist in some cities.

History

Conflict with Uyghurs

In the early 20th century, Uyghurs would reportedly not enter Hui mosques, and Hui and Han households were built together in a town; Uyghurs would live farther away. Uyghurs have been known to view Hui Muslims from other provinces of China as hostile and threatening. Mixed Han and Uyghur children are known as erzhuanzi (二转子); there are Uyghurs who call them piryotki, and shun them.

A book by Guo Rongxing on the unrest in Xinjiang states that the 1990 Baren Township riot protests were the result of 250 forced abortions imposed upon local Uyghur women by the Chinese government.

The Chinese government and individual Han Chinese citizens have been accused of discrimination against and ethnic hatred towards the Uyghur minority. This was a reported cause of the July 2009 Ürümqi riots, which occurred largely along racial lines. A People's Daily essay referred to the events as "so-called racial conflict", and several Western media sources called them "race riots". According to The Atlantic in 2009, there was an unofficial Chinese policy of denying passports to Uyghurs until they reached retirement age, especially if they intended to leave the country for the pilgrimage to Mecca. A 2009 paper from the National University of Singapore reported that China's policy of affirmative action had actually worsened the rift between the Han and Uyghurs, but also noted that both ethnic groups could still be friendly with each other, citing a survey where 70% of Uyghur respondents had Han friends while 82% of Han had Uyghur friends.

It was observed in 2013 that at least in the workplace, Uyghur-Han relations seemed relatively friendly.

According to Central Asia-Caucasus Institute founder S. Fredrick Starr, tensions between Hui and Uyghurs arose because Qing and Republican Chinese authorities used Hui troops and officials to dominate the Uyghurs and suppress Uyghur revolts. The massacre of Uyghurs by Ma Zhongying's Hui troops in the Battle of Kashgar caused unease as more Hui moved into the region from other parts of China. Per Starr, the Uyghur population grew by 1.7 percent in Xinjiang between 1940 and 1982, and the Hui population increased by 4.4 percent, with the population-growth disparity serving to increase interethnic tensions.

Modern China
Racist incidents continue to occur in modern China and have become a contentious topic because Chinese governmental sources deny or downplay its existence. Scholars have noted that the party line of the People's Republic of China largely portrays racism as a Western phenomenon which has led to a lack of acknowledgement of racism in its own society. The Constitution of the People's Republic of China states that discrimination against and the oppression of any ethnic group is prohibited. Conversely, the UN Committee on the Elimination of Racial Discrimination reported in August 2018 that Chinese law does not properly define "racial discrimination" and lacks an anti-racial discrimination law in line with the Paris Principles.

Despite rhetoric about equality among China's 56 recognized ethnic groups, in November 2012, newly elected General Secretary of the Chinese Communist Party, Xi Jinping released his model of the Chinese Dream, which has been criticized by scholars and media as Han-centric.

A 100-day crackdown on illegal foreigners in Beijing began in May 2012, with Beijing residents wary of foreign nationals due to recent crimes. China Central Television host Yang Rui said, controversially, that "foreign trash" should be cleaned out of the capital. A 2016 Gallup International poll had roughly 30% of Chinese respondents and 53% of Hong Kong respondents agreeing that some races were superior to others.

Anti-Japanese sentiment

Anti-Japanese sentiment primarily stems from Japanese war crimes which were committed during the Second Sino-Japanese War. History-textbook revisionism in Japan and the denial (or the whitewashing) of events such as the Nanjing Massacre by the Japanese far-right  has continued to inflame anti-Japanese feeling in China. It has been alleged that anti-Japanese sentiment is also partially the result of political manipulation by the Chinese Communist Party (CCP). According to a BBC report, anti-Japanese demonstrations received tacit approval from Chinese authorities, however the Chinese ambassador to Japan Wang Yi said that the Chinese government does not condone such protests.

Anti-Muslim sentiment 

Recent studies contend that historical conflicts between the Han Chinese and Muslims like the Northwest Hui Rebellion have been used by some Han Chinese to legitimize and fuel anti-Muslim beliefs and bias in contemporary China. Scholars and researchers have also argued that Western Islamophobia and the  "War on Terror" have contributed to the mainstreaming of anti-Muslim sentiments and practices in China. Recent studies have shown that Chinese news media coverage of Muslims and Islam is generally negative, in which portrayals of Muslims as dangerous and prone to terrorism, or as recipients of disproportionate aid from the government was common. Studies have also revealed that Chinese cyberspace contains much anti-Muslim rhetoric and that non-Muslim Chinese hold negative views towards Muslims and Islam. Discrimination against Muslims and sinicization of mosques have been reported.

Middle Eastern youth in China interviewed by the Middle East Institute in 2018 generally did not encounter discrimination. However, a Yemeni national said he received unfavourable reactions from some Chinese when told he was a Muslim, something he managed to overcome with time especially after having made Chinese friends.

Uyghur genocide 

Since 2014, the Chinese Communist Party under Xi Jinping Administration has pursued a policy which has led to more than one million Muslims (the majority of them Uyghurs) being held in secretive detention camps without any legal process. Critics of the policy have described it as the sinicization of Xinjiang and called it an ethnocide or cultural genocide, with many activists, NGOs, human rights experts, government officials, and the U.S. government calling it a genocide. The Chinese government did not acknowledge the existence of these re-education camps until 2018 and called them "vocational education and training centers." This name was changed to "vocational training centers" in 2019. The camps tripled in size from 2018 to 2019 despite the Chinese government claiming that most of the detainees had been released. The Chinese Ambassador to the United States, Cui Tiankai has stated that accusations of genocide made by United States President Joe Biden and Secretary of State Antony Blinken are "inaccurate."

There are widespread reports of forced abortion, contraception, and sterilization both inside and outside the re-education camps. NPR reports that a 37-year-old pregnant woman from the Xinjiang region said that she attempted to give up her Chinese citizenship to live in Kazakhstan but was told by the Chinese government that she needed to come back to China to complete the process. She alleges that officials seized the passports of her and her two children before coercing her into receiving an abortion to prevent her brother from being detained in an internment camp. Zumrat Dwut, a Uyghur woman, claimed that she was forcibly sterilized by tubal ligation during her time in a camp before her husband was able to get her out through requests to Pakistani diplomats. The Xinjiang regional government denies that she was forcibly sterilized. The Associated Press reports that there is a "widespread and systematic" practice of forcing Uyghur women to take birth control medication in the Xinjiang region, and many women have stated that they have been forced to receive contraceptive implants. The Heritage Foundation reported that officials forced Uyghur women to take unknown drugs and to drink some kind of white liquid that caused them to lose consciousness and sometimes causes them to cease menstruation altogether.

Tahir Hamut, a Uyghur Muslim, worked in a labor camp during elementary school when he was a child, and he later worked in a re-education camp as an adult, performing such tasks as picking cotton, shoveling gravel, and making bricks. "Everyone is forced to do all types of hard labor or face punishment," he said. "Anyone unable to complete their duties will be beaten."

Beginning in 2018, over one million Chinese government workers began forcibly living in the homes of Uyghur families to monitor and assess resistance to assimilation, and to watch for frowned-upon religious or cultural practices. These government workers were trained to call themselves "relatives" and have been described in Chinese state media as being a key part of enhancing "ethnic unity".

In March 2020, the Chinese government was found to be using the Uyghur minority for forced labor, inside sweat shops. According to a report published then by the Australian Strategic Policy Institute (ASPI), no fewer than around 80,000 Uyghurs were forcibly removed from the region of Xinjiang and used for forced labor in at least twenty-seven corporate factories. According to the Business and Human Rights resource center, corporations such as Abercrombie & Fitch, Adidas, Amazon, Apple, BMW, Fila, Gap, H&M, Inditex, Marks & Spencer, Nike, North Face, Puma, PVH, Samsung, and UNIQLO have each sourced from these factories prior to the publication of the ASPI report.

Discrimination against Tibetans

Anti-Tibetan racism has been displayed by ethnic Han Chinese on some occasions. Ever since its inception, the Chinese Communist Party (CCP), the sole legal ruling political party of the PRC (including Tibet), has been distributing historical documents which portray Tibetan culture as barbaric in order to justify Chinese control of the territory of Tibet, and is widely endorsed by Han Chinese nationalists. As such, many members of Chinese society have a negative view of Tibet which can be interpreted as racism. The traditional view is that Tibet was historically a feudal society which practiced serfdom/slavery and that this only changed due to Chinese influence in the region.

Tibetan-Muslim violence
Most Muslims in Tibet are Hui. Although hostility between Tibetans and Muslims stems from the Muslim warlord Ma Bufang's rule in Qinghai (the Ngolok rebellions (1917–49) and the Sino-Tibetan War), in 1949, the Communists ended the violence between Tibetans and Muslims. However, acts of Tibetan-Muslim violence have recently occurred. Riots broke out between Muslims and Tibetans over bones in soups and the price of balloons; Tibetans accused Muslims of being cannibals who cooked humans, attacking Muslim restaurants. Fires which were set by Tibetans burned the apartments and shops of Muslims, and Muslims stopped wearing their traditional headwear and began to pray in secret. Chinese-speaking Hui also have problems with the Tibetan Hui (the Tibetan-speaking Kache Muslim minority).

The main mosque in Lhasa was burned down by Tibetans, and Hui Muslims were assaulted by rioters in the 2008 Tibetan unrest. Tibetan exiles and foreign scholars overlook sectarian violence between Tibetan Buddhists and Muslims. Most Tibetans viewed the wars which were waged against Iraq and Afghanistan after the September 11 attacks positively, and anti-Muslim attitudes resulted in boycotts of Muslim-owned businesses. Some Tibetan Buddhists believe that Muslims cremate their imams and use the ashes to convert Tibetans to Islam by making Tibetans inhale the ashes, although they frequently oppose proposed Muslim cemeteries. Since the Chinese government supports the Hui Muslims, Tibetans attack the Hui to indicate anti-government sentiment and due to the background of hostility since Ma Bufang's rule; they resent perceived Hui economic domination.

In 1936, after Sheng Shicai expelled 20,000 Kazakhs from Xinjiang to Qinghai, Hui troops led by Ma Bufang reduced the number of Kazakhs to 135. Over 7,000 Kazakhs fled northern Xinjiang to the Tibetan Qinghai plateau region (via Gansu), causing unrest. Ma Bufang relegated the Kazakhs to pastureland in Qinghai, but the Hui, Tibetans and Kazakhs in the region continued to clash.

Discrimination against Mongols

The CCP has been accused of sinicization by gradually replacing Mongolian languages with Mandarin Chinese. Critics call it cultural genocide for dismantling people's minority languages and eradicating their minority identities. The implementation of the Mandarin language policy began in Tongliao, because 1 million ethnic Mongols live there making it the most Mongolian-populated area. The 5 million Mongols are less than 20 percent of the population in Inner Mongolia.

The 2020 Inner Mongolia protests were caused by a curriculum reform imposed on ethnic schools by the China's Inner Mongolia Department of Education. The two-part reform replace Mongolian as the medium of instruction by Standard Mandarin in three particular subjects and replace three regional textbooks, printed in Mongolian script, by the  edited by the Ministry of Education, written in Standard Mandarin.

On 20 September 2020, up to 5,000 ethnic Mongolians were arrested in Inner Mongolia for protesting against enacted policies that outlaw their nomadic pastoralism lifestyle. The director of the Southern Mongolian Human Rights Information Center (SMHRIC), Enghebatu Togochog, called it “cultural genocide” by the CCP. Two-third of the 6 million ethnic Mongolians have a nomadic lifestyle that has been practiced for millennia.

In October 2020, the Chinese government asked Nantes History Museum in France not to use the words “Genghis Khan” and “Mongolia" in the exhibition project dedicated to the history of Genghis Khan and the Mongol Empire. Nantes History Museum engaged the exhibition project in partnership with the Inner Mongolia Museum in Hohhot, China. Nantes History Museum stopped the exhibition project. The director of the Nantes museum, Bertrand Guillet, says: “Tendentious elements of rewriting aimed at completely eliminating Mongolian history and culture in favor of a new national narrative”.

Discrimination against Africans and people of African descent
Reports of racial discrimination against Africans have trended in foreign media since the 1970s. The Chinese government has continually provided aid to China-friendly African countries, which includes funding university education for African students of elite backgrounds. Scholar Barry Sautman believes that tensions between African students and Chinese students escalated since the 1970s because of a lack of interaction between the two groups, racist remarks made by Chinese media, and an increase of racial assaults and slurs by Chinese students. Publicized incidents of discrimination against Africans have been the Nanjing anti-African protests in 1988 and a 1989 student-led protest in Beijing in response to an African dating a Chinese person. Police action against Africans in Guangzhou has also been reported as discriminatory. In 2009, accusations by Chinese media that African undocumented immigrants residing in China could be as high as 200,000 people sparked racist attacks over the internet against Africans and mixed African-Chinese people. In 2017, a museum in Wuhan was condemned for comparing Africans to wild animals. In 2018, the CCTV New Year's Gala sparked controversies for blackface performances and portraying Africans as submissive to the support from China. During the CCTV New Year's Gala in 2021, Chinese actors again put on blackface; the Chinese Foreign minister denied that the performance was racist.

Reports of racism against Africans and black foreigners of African descent in China grew during the COVID-19 pandemic in mainland China. Black foreigners not from Africa have also faced racism and discrimination in China. In response to criticism over COVID-19 related racism and discrimination against Africans in China, Chinese authorities set up a hotline for foreign nationals and laid out measures discouraging businesses and rental houses in Guangzhou from refusing people based on race or nationality. Foreign Ministry spokesman Zhao Lijian claimed that the country has "zero tolerance" for discrimination. CNN stated that this claim ignored the decades' long history of racism and discrimination against Africans in China which predated the COVID-19 pandemic.

According to BBC News in 2020, many people in China have expressed solidarity for the Black Lives Matter movement. The George Floyd protests have reportedly sparked conversations about race that would have not otherwise occurred in the country, including treatment of China's own ethnic minorities. During the 2022 Shanghai lockdown, viral locally produced videos of Africans shouting scripted, positive wishes to the Chinese audience have been criticised as stereotypical and even dehumanising.

It has been reported since 2008 that many Africans have experienced racism in Hong Kong such as being subject to humiliating police searches on the street, being avoided on public transport, and getting blocked from bars and clubs.

Discrimination against South and Southeast Asians 

There have been reports of widespread discrimination in Hong Kong against South Asian minorities regarding housing, employment, public services, and checks by the police. A 2001 survey found that 82% of ethnic minority respondents said they had suffered discrimination from shops, markets, and restaurants in Hong Kong. A 2020 survey found that more than 90% of ethnic minority respondents experienced some form of housing discrimination. Foreign domestic workers, mostly South Asians, have been at risk of forced labor, subpar accommodation, and verbal, physical, or sexual abuse by employers. A 2016 survey from Justice Centre Hong Kong suggested that 17% of migrant domestic workers were engaged in forced labor, while 94.6% showed signs of exploitation.

Filipina women in Hong Kong are often reportedly stereotyped as promiscuous, disrespectful, and lacking self-control. Reports of racist abuse from Hong Kong fans towards their Filipino counterparts at a 2013 football game came to light, after an increased negative image of the Philippines from the 2010 Manila hostage crisis. In 2014, an insurance ad, as well as a school textbook, drew some controversy for alleged racial stereotyping of Filipina maids.

Some Pakistanis in 2013 reported of banks barring them from opening accounts because they came from a 'terrorist country', as well as locals next to them covering their mouths thinking they smell, finding their beard ugly, or stereotyping them as claiming welfare benefits fraudulently. A 2014 survey of Pakistani and Nepalese construction workers in Hong Kong found that discrimination and harassment from local colleagues led to perceived mental stress, physical ill health, and reduced productivity.

South Asian minorities in Hong Kong faced increased xenophobia during the COVID-19 pandemic, with media narratives blaming them as more likely to spread the virus.

Discrimination against Jews

Biases in favor of European and European-descended people 
The Los Angeles Times and Vice Media alleged that a hiring preference for white English teachers over members of other groups is common in China. In 2014, a Media Diversified article by a former English teacher in Ningbo alleged that the English teaching industry was responsible for "painting the image of ‘good English’ as a domain reserved for white people" and it also highlighted the need for a more diverse staff in the industry.

International responses 
In terms of international responses to China's policies for Tibetans, Uyghurs and Mongols in the Tibet Autonomous Region, Xinjiang, and the Inner Mongolia Autonomous Region respectively, while many outside of Mongolia are familiar with China's human rights abuses against the Uyghurs and Tibetans, few are familiar with the plight of the Mongols. An international petition titled “Save Education in Inner Mongolia” has so far received less than 21,000 signatures. Former U.S. President Trump signed the Uyghur Human Rights Policy Act of 2020 into law, and the Tibetan Policy and Support Act of 2019 has passed the House of Representatives. The Southern Mongolian Congress, an Inner Mongolian activist group based out of Japan, has since written an open letter asking the U.S. Congress to do the same for the Mongols.

Much of the world has condemned China's detention of Uyghurs. In January 2021, U.S. Secretary of State Mike Pompeo declared that China is committing crimes against humanity and genocide against Uyghurs, making the U.S. the first country to apply those terms to the Chinese government's abuses. Current U.S. President Joe Biden used the term genocide to refer to China's abuses while campaigning, and his secretary of state, namely Antony Blinken, affirmed Pompeo's declaration.

Owing to China's rise, Japan is typically wary of angering China, which is its largest trading partner. Tokyo is a close ally of Washington. It did not, however, join the U.S. and several other nations in March 2021 in imposing sanctions on China over its repression of its mostly Muslim Uyghur majority. In April 2021, however, Japanese Foreign Minister Toshimitsu Motegi, during a 90-minute phone call with Chinese Foreign Minister Wang Yi, called on his Chinese counterpart to take action to improve human-rights conditions for Uyghurs. This unusually strong message from Tokyo came shortly before Prime Minister Yoshihide Suga traveled to the U.S. for a summit with President Biden on April 16. South Korea, diplomatically squeezed between its close ally that is the U.S. and its economic trading partner that is China, has remained quiet on Xinjiang.

Ethnic slurs

According to historian Frank Dikötter,
A common historical response to serious threats directed towards a symbolic universe is "nihilation", or the conceptual liquidation of everything inconsistent with official doctrine. Foreigners were labelled "barbarians" or "devils", to be conceptually eliminated. The official rhetoric reduced the Westerner to a devil, a ghost, an evil and unreal goblin hovering on the border of humanity. Many texts of the first half of the nineteenth century referred to the English as "foreign devils" (yangguizi), "devil slaves" (guinu), "barbarian devils" (fangui), "island barbarians" (daoyi), "blue-eyed barbarian slaves" (biyan yinu), or "red-haired barbarians" (hongmaofan).

Graphic pejoratives about race and ethnicity

Chinese orthography provides opportunities to write ethnic insults logographically; this is known as "graphic pejoratives". This originated in the fact that Chinese characters used to transcribe the names of non-Chinese peoples were graphically pejorative ethnic slurs, where the insult was not the Chinese word but the character used to write it. The sinologist Endymion Wilkinson says,At the same time as finding characters to fit the sounds of a foreign word or name it is also possible to choose ones with a particular meaning, in the case of non-Han peoples and foreigners, usually a pejorative meaning. It was the practice, for example, to choose characters with an animal or reptile signific for southern non-Han peoples, and many northern peoples were given characters for their names with the dog or leather hides signific. In origin this practice may have derived from the animal totems or tribal emblems typical of these peoples. This is not to deny that in later Chinese history such graphic pejoratives fitted neatly with Han convictions of the superiority of their own culture as compared to the uncultivated, hence animal-like, savages and barbarians.

List of ethnic slurs in Chinese
鬼子 (guǐzi) – "Guizi", devils, refers to foreigners
 日本鬼子 (rìběn guǐzi ) – literally "Japanese devil", used to refer to Japanese, can be translated as Jap. In 2010 Japanese internet users on 2channel created the fictional moe character  which refers to the ethnic term, with Hinomoto Oniko being the Japanese kun'yomi reading of the Han characters "日本鬼子".
 二鬼子 (èr guǐzi ) – literally "second devil", used to refer to Korean soldiers who were a part of the Japanese army during the Sino-Japanese war in World War II.
Xiao Riben (小日本 Small Japanese)
鬼佬 – Gweilo, literally "ghostly man" (directed at Europeans) 
黑鬼 (hei guǐ)/(hak gwei) – "Black devil" (directed at Africans).
阿三 (A Sae) or 紅頭阿三 (Ghondeu Asae) - Originally a Shanghainese term used against Indians, it is also used in Mandarin.
chán-tóu (纏頭; turban heads) – used during the Republican period against Uyghurs
Erzhuanzi (二轉子) – ethnically mixed The term was said by European explorers in the 19th century to refer to a people descended from Chinese, Taghliks, and Mongols living in the area from Ku-ch'eng-tze to Barköl in Xinjiang.
Gaoli bangzi (高麗棒子 Korean Stick) - Used against Koreans, both North Koreans and South Koreans.

Notes

References

Further reading
  - Published 9 May 2015

Chinese culture
China
 
Separatism in China
Anti-black racism in Asia
China